Below is a list of notable footballers who have played for USM Alger. Generally, this means players that have played 100 or more league matches for the club. However, some players who have played fewer matches are also included; this includes players that have had considerable success either at other clubs or at international level, as well as players who are well remembered by the supporters for particular reasons.

Players are listed in alphabetical order according to the date of their first-team official debut for the club. Appearances and goals are for first-team competitive matches only. Substitute appearances included. Statistics accurate as of 17 June 2022.

List of USM Alger players

Nationalities are indicated by the corresponding FIFA country code.

List of All-time appearances
This List of All-time appearances for USM Alger contains football players who have played for USM Alger and have managed to accrue 100 or more appearances.

Bold Still playing competitive football in USM Alger.

1 Includes the Super Cup and League Cup.
2 Includes the Cup Winners' Cup, CAF Cup, Confederation Cup and Champions League.
3 Includes the Arab Champions League and UAFA Club Cup.

Clean sheets 
Bold Still playing competitive football in USM Alger.
Statistics correct as of game against ES Sétif on June 17, 2022.

Players from USM Alger to Europe

Award winners
(Whilst playing for USM Alger)

Algerian Footballer of the Year
  Amar Ammour – 2003
  Billel Dziri – 2005

Top goalscorers in CAF Champions League
  Tarek Hadj Adlane (8 goals) – 1997
  Mamadou Diallo (10 goals) – 2004

Top goalscorers in Algerian Ligue 1
  Moncef Ouichaoui (18 goals) – 2002–03
  Oussama Darfalou (18 goals) – 2017–18

Algerian professional football awards Goalkeeper of the Year
  Lamine Zemmamouche – 2012–13, 2013–14

Algerian professional football awards Young Player of the Year 
  Islam Adel Aït Ali Yahia – 2008–09
  Farouk Chafaï – 2011–12
  Zinedine Ferhat – 2012–13
  Mohammed Benkhemassa – 2015–16

Algerian professional football awards Manager of the Year
  Hubert Velud – 2013–14

List of foreign USM Alger football players

This is a list of all foreign players of USM Alger, including statistics. Freddy Zemmour's from Pied-Noir one of the few French players who have decided to stay in Algeria first foreign to play with USM Alger immediately after Independence for 6 seasons in which he won one title in 1963. On 1998 USM Alger signed with the first foreigner after 30 years, the Nigerian Mohamed Manga, 5 years after that joined to USM Alger international Malian Mamadou Diallo, who became one of the most important players in the Algerian league and in one year scored 18 goals, including 10 goals in the 2004 CAF Champions League Was behind his victory over the top scorer. immediately after that, he went to the Ligue 1 club FC Nantes for 700,000 euros. On 18 January 2009, USM Alger signed the first South American player Wuiwel Isea from Venezuela. And it's considered a failed deal, he scored only one goal from 14 matches. On 28 May 2012, Malagasy international Carolus Andriamatsinoro joined USM Alger from Paradou AC and spent five seasons with them, during which he won six titles to be the most foreigner to achieve titles with USM Alger and in Algeria, also played 132 games and scored 20 goals to be the most appearances and the most goalscorer. He left USMA in 2017 after the end of his contract. In the 2020–21 season, USM Alger contracted with Burkinabe international Hamed Belem from Rahimo FC and Ghanaian Kwame Opoku from Asante Kotoko in a historic deal amounting to 350 thousand euros.

List of foreign players
*Bold International players.

Foreign players of All-time appearances
Competitive matches only, includes appearances as used substitute. Numbers in brackets indicate goals scored.

Notes

References

Players
 
USM Alger
USM Alger
Association football player non-biographical articles